Ada Lunardoni (later Cumiskey, then Hutcheon; March 8, 1911 – January 11, 2003) was an American artistic gymnast. She competed at the 1936 Summer Olympics and placed fifth with the team.

She was born in 1911 in West Hoboken, New Jersey, which is now part of Union City. Lunardoni first married to a fellow gymnast Frank Cumiskey and had three children with him, but the marriage did not last. She then re-married and lived the rest of her life in New Jersey.

References

1911 births
2003 deaths
Gymnasts at the 1936 Summer Olympics
Olympic gymnasts of the United States
American female artistic gymnasts
Sportspeople from Union City, New Jersey
20th-century American women
20th-century American people
People from Union City, New Jersey
21st-century American women